Hana Bořkovcová (4 June 1927 - 25 February 2009), née Knappová, was a Czech novelist and holocaust survivor. Born in Prague, she was deported to Terezín in 1943, and later to Auschwitz, which she and her mother survived. After the war, she got married and worked with children. Eventually, she began writing stories and novels.

Biography

Early life 
Hana Bořkovcová was born in Prague in 1927 to an assimilated Jewish family. Her father worked as a businessman selling dental supplies. When the Nazis occupied Czechoslovakia, she was expelled from school because she was Jewish.

During World War II 
In 1943, she and her family were deported to Terezín from Prague. In Terezín, Hana worked as an assistant teacher. In the fall of 1944, she and her family were deported to Auschwitz. In Auschwitz, she and her mother survived the selection and were transported to the Gross-Rosen camp, a subcamp of Sachsenhausen. Her father and brother were killed in Auschwitz. In January 1945, Hana and her mother were sent on a death march until the end of the war.

After World War II 
When she returned to Prague after the war, she married and converted to Catholicism. She had five children, and began writing. In 1964, some of Bořkovcová's works began to be published in literary journals, and she also published a fair amount of Young Adult literature. In 2008, Hana was interviewed by Post Bellum, an oral history organisation, as part of their Stories of the 20th Century project. She died on 25 February 2009.

Works

Books 
 Světýlka (1971)
 Vzteklouni (1975)
 My tři cvoci (1973)
 Cesta kolem světa za osmdesát let (1982) 
 Stan, do kterého prší (1986) 
 Tři cvoci a cizí holka (1987) 
 Jdi pryč (1994)
 Zakázané holky (1995)
 Cizí holka (1999)
 Soukromý rozhovor (2004)
 Píšu a sešit mi leží na kolenou (1940 to 1946, published 2011)

References

1927 births
2009 deaths
Writers from Prague
Czech Jews
Sachsenhausen concentration camp survivors